The 2013–14 season was the 125th season of competitive football by Celtic. Celtic had a new shirt sponsor for the season with Irish Cider brand Magners taking over from Tennent's Lager for the next three years.

Celtic began the season with further Champions League success in their sights. They were faced with the burden of replacing three main pieces of their squad in; Gary Hooper and Kelvin Wilson were sold to Norwich City and Nottingham Forest respectively, whilst the highly rated Victor Wanyama was sold to Southampton for a Scottish record fee of £12.5 million. Neil Lennon rebuilt his squad by signing Virgil van Dijk and Amido Balde in the summer, and Teemu Pukki from Schalke 04 on transfer deadline day. Celtic were drawn with Cliftonville in their first qualifying round and easily disposed of the Northern Irish champions 5–0 on aggregate. They were next drawn with IF Elfsborg and squeezed by with a 1–0 aggregate win, with Kris Commons scoring the only goal in the first leg at Celtic Park. Although favoured to qualify for the group stages with minimal challenge after being drawn with Kazakh champions Shakhter Karagandy, Celtic found themselves losing the first leg in Karagandy 2–0. Celtic returned to Scotland to an electric atmosphere at Celtic Park in the home leg, in proved to be the high point of their 2013-14 Champions League campaign. They overcame the 2–0 deficit to level the aggregate thanks to goals by Kris Commons and Georgios Samaras. James Forrest completed the comeback for Celtic with a 90th-minute strike, sending Celtic Park into a frenzy.

Thereafter, Celtic found themselves drawn with AC Milan, Ajax and Barcelona (again) in the group stages. The campaign was dismal; winning only once with a 2–1 home win over Ajax, and slumping to a 6–1 rout away against Barcelona in the final group match. That game saw Celtic concede the most goals they had ever done in a single European tie, and equalled their previous heaviest defeat in Europe (5-0 against FC Artmedia Bratislava).

Celtic's 2014 domestic campaign was filled with ups and downs. Towards the end of February, Celtic had not lost a single game in the league, and drew just twice against Dundee United and Hibernian. Their league success did not translate to cup competition however; they bowed out of both the Scottish League Cup (0–1 to Morton), and the Scottish Cup(1–2 to Aberdeen), both at Celtic Park. Celtic also struggled to find a suitable strike partner for Anthony Stokes, forcing Kris Commons into a striking role. Neil Lennon signed former Hibs striker Leigh Griffiths on transfer deadline day in January 2014, as well as Stefan Johansen earlier in the month. After being unable to reach an agreement on a new contract, Joe Ledley left Celtic for Crystal Palace.

On 2 February 2014 goalkeeper Fraser Forster set a new a club-record of 11 league clean sheets in a row, surpassing a record of 10 clean sheets set by Charlie Shaw in the 1921-22 season. On 22 February, he broke Bobby Clark's Scottish League record of 1155 minutes without conceding a goal in a league match. Celtic won 2–0 away at Hearts, and Forster racked up his 13th consecutive clean sheet in the league. 
Forster's clean sheet run finally ended on 1,256 minutes against Aberdeen on 25 February 2014, as Aberdeen defeated Celtic 2–1 to end their unbeaten run in the league.

Celtic finished the season as league champions again, their third consecutive Scottish League title, scoring 102 goals in the process. Celtic clinched the title after a 5–1 away win against Partick Thistle on 26 March 2014.
It is the earliest that the title has been won since the 1928-29 season, when Old Firm Rivals Rangers won it on 16 March.

Kris Commons was the top scorer in Scotland, netting 32 goals, and won both the PFA Scotland and Scottish Football Writers' Player of the Year awards.

Competitions

Pre-season and friendlies

*Celtic lose the match 5-4 on penalties

Scottish Premiership

UEFA Champions League

Scottish League Cup

Scottish Cup

Team record

Player statistics

Squad
Last updated 11 May 2014 

Key:
 = Appearances,
 = Goals,
 = Yellow card,
 = Red card

Goalscorers
Last updated 11 May 2014

Team statistics

League table

Technical staff

Transfers

Players in 

Total spend: £13.6 million

Players out 

Total received: £21 million

See also
 List of Celtic F.C. seasons
Nine in a row

References

Celtic F.C. seasons
Celtic
Celtic
Scottish football championship-winning seasons